José David Effron (born 24 July 1986) is an Argentine Paralympic judoka who competes in international level events. He was a Paralympic silver medalist at the 2012 Summer Paralympics and a double Parapan American Games medalist.

References

1986 births
Living people
Sportspeople from Buenos Aires
Paralympic judoka of Argentina
Judoka at the 2012 Summer Paralympics
Judoka at the 2016 Summer Paralympics
Medalists at the 2012 Summer Paralympics
Medalists at the 2011 Parapan American Games
Medalists at the 2015 Parapan American Games